"Arrivederci" (Goodbye!) is a 1959 Italian song composed by Umberto Bindi (music) and Giorgio Calabrese (lyrics). "Arrivederci" marked the record debut of Bindi, who recorded two versions of the song, but it was eventually led to success by Don Marino Barreto Jr., whose version topped the Italian hit parade.
 
The song placed at the second place at the first edition of Canzonissima, in a version performed in duet by Miranda Martino and Nicola Arigliano.

"Arrivederci" was later covered by numerous artists, including Ornella Vanoni, Mina, Caterina Valente, Claudio Villa, Sonia Braga, Ricchi e Poveri, Gianni Morandi, Demis Roussos, Emilio Pericoli, Nilla Pizzi,  Bob Azzam, Bruno Martino, Ernesto Bonino, Fred Bongusto, Fausto Papetti, Joe Sentieri, Flo Sandon's, Lara Saint Paul, Orietta Berti, Tony Romano, Piergiorgio Farina.

Track listing

 7" single – SRL 10-029 
 "Arrivederci"  (Umberto Bindi, Giorgio Calabrese)
 "Odio" (Umberto Bindi, Giorgio Calabrese)

Charts

References

 

Songs about parting
1959 singles
Italian songs
1959 songs
Number-one singles in Italy
Songs written by Umberto Bindi
Demis Roussos songs
Caterina Valente songs
Songs written by Giorgio Calabrese